Charles Benjamin "Chuck" Mawhinney (born 1949) is a former United States Marine who holds the Corps' record for the most confirmed sniper kills, having recorded 103 confirmed kills and 216 probable kills in 16 months during the Vietnam War.

Service in the Vietnam War 
Mawhinney, the son of a World War II Marine Corps veteran, was born in 1949 in Lakeview, Oregon, and was an avid hunter in his youth. He graduated from high school in June 1967 and joined the U.S. Marine Corps later that year—after the deer season.

Following enlistment, he attended Scout Sniper School at Camp Pendleton and graduated in April 1968. From there he received orders to South Vietnam where upon arrival he was assigned as a rifleman to Lima Company 1st Battalion, 5th Marines, 1st Marine Division. He remained in this unit for 3 months until he was re-assigned to 5th Marine Regiment HQ Scout Sniper Platoon. There he worked as a scout sniper for different companies with the 1st, 2nd and 3rd Battalions. He also worked with the South Korean Marines, Force Recon, Army CAG Unit, but the majority of his time was with Delta Company, 1/5 Marines. During this tour he is credited with 103 confirmed People's Army of Vietnam (PAVN)/Viet Cong (VC) kills and 216 probables. He spent 16 months in Vietnam, starting in early 1968.

On Valentine's Day 1969, Mawhinney encountered an enemy platoon and killed 16 PAVN soldiers with head shots.

"It was the ultimate hunting trip: a man hunting another man who was hunting me," Mawhinney told the Los Angeles Times. "Don't talk to me about hunting lions or elephants; they don't fight back with rifles and scopes. I just loved it." Mawhinney sought to change the public perception about snipers, who he maintains save lives by sapping the enemy's will to fight. "My rules of engagement were simple: If they had a weapon, they were going down. Except for an NVA paymaster I hit at 900 yards, everyone I killed had a weapon," he said.

Mawhinney's one regret was the one that got away. After a leave from Vietnam, he returned and retrieved his weapon from the armorer, who assured Mawhinney that he hadn't altered the rifle. But when Mawhinney spotted an enemy at only 300 yards, a range he was routinely a deadly shot, he missed several times, and the man got away.

"I can't help thinking about how many people that he may have killed later, how many of my friends, how many Marines. He [messed] up and he deserved to die. That still bothers me."

After a chaplain declared him "combat fatigued", Mawhinney returned to the United States and served briefly as a marksmanship instructor at Camp Pendleton.

Civilian life and recognition
After leaving the Marine Corps in 1970, Mawhinney returned home to Lakeview, Oregon, married, and worked for the U.S. Forest Service until his retirement in the late 1990s.

Mawhinney told no one about his service as a sniper, not even his wife. For more than two decades, his accomplishments as a sniper were almost entirely unknown—even Mawhinney himself did not know how his record compared to his peers.

In 1991, Mawhinney was thrust into the limelight when his exploits were recounted by fellow Marine sniper and author Joseph Ward in his book, Dear Mom: A Sniper's Vietnam. In it, Ward credited Mawhinney with 101 confirmed kills. This was controversial at the time, as it was generally believed that the 93 confirmed kills by the legendary Carlos Hathcock was more than any other American sniper. However, subsequent research showed that U.S. Army sniper Adelbert Waldron actually held the record, with 109 confirmed kills. Mawhinney's documented total was found to be 103 confirmed kills, with an additional 216 "probable kills". A third Marine Corps sniper, Eric R. England, had 98 confirmed kills. Mawhinney was then recognized as the USMC sniper with the most confirmed kills, and the second most of any US service member.

After the revelation of his extraordinary record as a sniper, Mawhinney slowly increased his public profile. Following his retirement from the Forest Service, he began speaking at conventions and public events and attending national sniper shooting competitions. Mawhinney is a spokesman for Strider Knives, which produces a knife bearing his signature on the blade. One of these knives is awarded to the top graduate of each class from the USMC Scout Sniper School in Camp Pendleton, CA. , Mawhinney continues to speak to classes of professional snipers in training.

One of the rifles he used in Vietnam is displayed in the Vietnam Gallery of the National Museum of the Marine Corps, where it has been shown since its opening in 2006.

An "astounding" shot by Mawhinney has been recreated for the History Channel special, "Sniper: The Anatomy of the Kill".

Footnotes

Further reading

External links
 Official website

1949 births
Living people
Military personnel from Oregon
American military snipers
United States Marines
United States Marine Corps personnel of the Vietnam War
Sniper warfare
People from Lakeview, Oregon
People from Baker City, Oregon
Date of birth missing (living people)